Klampenborg station is a regional and commuter railway station serving the suburb of Klampenborg north of Copenhagen, Denmark. Train services to Klampenborg Station are used by people in large numbers who during the summer season visit the Dyrehavsbakken amusement park, the Jægersborg Dyrehave forest park or enjoy the sun at Bellevue Beach.

The station is located on the Coast Line between Copenhagen and Helsingør, and is the northern terminus of the Klampenborg radial of Copenhagen's S-train network. It is served by a frequent regional rail service between Helsingør and Copenhagen, operated by Danish State Railways, as well as line C of the S-train network.

History

Train service began by DSJS in 1863 and was taken over by DSB in 1864. The current station building was built in 1897. Like the other stations on the Øresund line, it was designed by Heinrich Wenck. The station was among the first served by the S-train, as service began on the 3 of April 1934 when the line Frederiksberg-Vanløse-Hellerup-Klampenborg was opened.

Architecture

In line with the stations on the Coast line, as well as of Heinrich Wenck's work in general, the station is designed in National Romantic style. The station site also include an open waiting area covered by an elaborate cast iron roof. All buildings are listed.

See also
 List of railway stations in Denmark

References

External links

 Danish State Railways
 S-train
 Danish Rail Transport Agency
 Danish Ministry of Transport
 Copenhagen Traffic Information
 Danish national archives in danish 

S-train (Copenhagen) stations
Listed railway stations in Copenhagen
Listed buildings and structures in Gentofte Municipality
Railway stations opened in 1863
Heinrich Wenck buildings
National Romantic architecture in Copenhagen
Art Nouveau architecture in Copenhagen
Art Nouveau railway stations
Knud Tanggaard Seest railway stations
Railway stations in Denmark opened in the 19th century